Mason Lake is a lake located north of Perkins Clearing, New York. Fish species present in the lake are brook trout, black bullhead, and yellow perch. There is carry down access off Jessup River Road on the west shore.

References

Lakes of New York (state)
Lakes of Hamilton County, New York